Cigu District or Qigu is a rural district in the city of Tainan with about 21,471 inhabitants, situated on the westernmost point of the island of Taiwan.

The Cigu Lagoon is located in this township, and an ecological conservation area for black-faced spoonbills is situated on the estuary of the Zengwen River. It was a salt producing area, but now most of the salt products are imported from other counties.

History
Around 360 years ago, seven settlers arrived in the area from Fujian and built a fish farm. At that time, the area was mostly inhabited. Gradually, new settlers started to spread northwards over the next 80 years. There was only one port at that time and people made a living based from offshore fishing. As the population gradually increased, they began to cultivate the lands near the coast to grow grains and make salt.

Republic of China
After the handover of Taiwan from Japan to the Republic of China in 1945, Cigu was organized as a rural township of Tainan County. On 25 December 2010, Tainan County was merged with Tainan City and Cigu was upgraded to a district of the city.

Administrative divisions
The district consists of Hougang, Datan, Dujia, Dingshan, Xiliao, Yancheng, Longshan, Xinan, Qigu, Yucheng, Dacheng, Shulin, Zhongliao, Zhuqiao, Yige, Yongji, Sangu and Shifen Village.

Tourist attractions

 Black-faced spoonbill Conservation Area
 Cigu Lagoon
 Cigu Salt Fields
 Cigu Salt Mountain
 Taiwan Salt Museum

Notable natives
 Huang Wei-che, Mayor of Tainan
 Su Huan-chih, Magistrate of Tainan County (2001-2010)

See also
 Tainan

References

Districts of Tainan